The 1972 CONCACAF Pre-Olympic Tournament was the third edition of the CONCACAF Pre-Olympic Tournament, the quadrennial, international football tournament organised by the CONCACAF to determine which national teams from the North, Central America and Caribbean region qualify for the Olympic football tournament.

Mexico, won their second title, and qualified for the 1972 Summer Olympics together with runners-up United States as CONCACAF representatives.

Qualification

Qualified teams
The following teams qualified for the final tournament.

1 Only final tournament.

Final round

Qualified teams for Summer Olympics
The following two teams from CONCACAF qualified for the 1972 Summer Olympics.

2 Bold indicates champions for that year. Italic indicates hosts for that year.

References 

1972
Oly
Football qualification for the 1972 Summer Olympics